Executive Council may refer to:

Government 
 Executive Council (Commonwealth countries), a constitutional organ that exercises executive power and advises the governor
 Executive Council of Bern, the government of the Swiss canton of Bern
 Executive Council of Catalonia, the government of the Spanish autonomous community of Catalonia
 Executive Council of Vojvodina, the government of the Serbian province of Vojvodina
 Executive Council (South Africa), the name of the cabinet in the governments of South African provinces
 Executive Council of Hong Kong, a council that advises and assists the Chief Executive of Hong Kong
 Executive Council of the Irish Free State, cabinet and de facto executive branch of government of the 1922–1937 Irish Free State
 Executive Council of Macau, a council that advises and assists the Chief Executive of Macau
 Massachusetts Governor's Council, an executive body of the US state of Massachusetts 
 Executive Council of New Hampshire, an executive body of the US state of New Hampshire
 Executive Council of New South Wales, the cabinet of New South Wales, consisting of the Ministers, presided over by the Governor
 Executive Council of the African Union, a council of ministers designated by the governments of member countries
 Executive Council of Abu Dhabi, the local executive authority of the Emirate of Abu Dhabi
 Federal Executive Council (Australia)
 Federal Executive Council (Nigeria)
 Executive Council of Singapore, 1946–1959
 replaced the Executive Council of the Straits Settlements (c. 1877) and replaced by the Council of Ministers of Singapore (ceased to exist during 1963–1965)
 Executive Council of Sikkim, 1953–1974
 replaced by State Government of Sikkim after joining India
 Federal Executive Council (Yugoslavia)
 Viceroy's Executive Council, an advisory body during the time of British rule in India
 Executive Council, part of the executive branch of the government of Anguilla; see Politics of Anguilla

Other fields 
 Alberta College and Technical Institute Student Executive Council, a coalition of college and technical institute students' associations
 Stock Exchange Executive Council, a financial regulation council in the People's Republic of China